Rubus ferrugineus is a Caribbean species of brambles in the rose family. It has been found only on the island of Guadeloupe in the West Indies, part of the French Republic.

Rubus ferrugineus is a perennial shrub or small tree with stems up to 6 meters (20 feet) tall, with curved prickles. Stems are covered with wool and armed with curved prickles. Leaves are compound with 3 or 5 leaflets. Flowers are white. Fruits are black and egg-shaped.

References

ferrugineus
Flora of Guadeloupe
Plants described in 1827